Wang Hai (born December 1960) is a vice admiral of the Chinese People's Liberation Army Navy (PLAN). He has been Commander of the South Sea Fleet since January 2017. He formerly served as a Deputy Commander of the PLA Navy.

Career
Wang Hai served for many years in the PLA Navy's South Sea Fleet. He attained the rank of rear admiral in July 2010. In September 2012, when Liaoning, China's first aircraft carrier was commissioned into service, Wang Hai was named the first commander of its carrier battle group.

In March 2014, Wang became chief of staff of the PLAN's North Sea Fleet, succeeding rear admiral Wei Gang (魏钢). In July 2015, he was appointed a deputy commander of the PLA Navy.

In August 2015, Wang Hai and Vice Admiral Aleksandr Fedotenkov of the Russian Navy commanded the Joint Sea-2015 (II) in Vladivostok, a joint naval exercise conducted by the Chinese and Russian navies.

In July 2016, he was promoted to the rank of vice admiral (zhong jiang).

References

1961 births
Living people
Commanders of the South Sea Fleet
Alternate members of the 19th Central Committee of the Chinese Communist Party